Min Jung "MJ" Lee (born March 5, 1987) is a South Korean-born American political correspondent for CNN and is currently a White House correspondent for the network.

She has previously worked for Politico.

Early life and education 
Lee was born in Seoul, South Korea and raised in Hong Kong, where she and her brother attended Hong Kong International School (an American-system style school). In her junior year of high school, she moved to the United States to attend a boarding school and has never returned to South Korea. In 2009, she graduated from Georgetown University with a degree in government and Chinese. During college, she interned for The Washington Post and South China Morning Post. Lee was offered an entry level journalism position, but was then rejected due to being on a visa.

Career 
Months after graduation, Lee began working at Politico as a web producer. By 2012, she was a finance reporter after a year on the breaking news desk. In 2014, she started working at CNN. Since working at CNN, she has covered the 2016 United States presidential election (both Trump and Clinton campaigns); as well as how the Me Too movement has affected Capitol Hill, covering the allegations against ousted U.S. Senator Al Franken (D-MN), former White House aide and Staff Secretary Rob Porter, and former U.S. Representative Blake Farenthold (R-TX) (all of whom resigned from their positions as a result of abuse or sexual misconduct allegations). She has also covered the Republicans' contemporary attempts to repeal the Affordable Care Act. Lee covered the 2020 Democratic presidential primary with a focus on the Elizabeth Warren campaign, and the 2020 United States presidential election with a focus on the Joe Biden campaign.

In January 2021, Lee was promoted to White House correspondent under the Biden administration.

Personal life 
Lee became an American citizen on September 17, 2016, on Ellis Island, coinciding with her coverage of the 2016 US presidential election campaign. She is married to fellow journalist Alex Burns. In February 2021, she gave birth to their first child.

References 

1987 births
Living people
South Korean journalists
South Korean women journalists
South Korean expatriates in Hong Kong
CNN people
Georgetown University alumni
Politico people
People with acquired American citizenship
People from Seoul
American women journalists
21st-century American journalists
Journalists from Washington, D.C.
South Korean emigrants to the United States
Journalists from New York City
21st-century American women
American people of Korean descent